Kundert can refer to
 Klundert, city in the Dutch province of North Brabant

People 
 Jacques van der Klundert (b. 1938), Dutch bicycle racer
 Raymond van de Klundert (b. 1964), Dutch author
 Theo van de Klundert (b. 1936), Dutch economist